"Old Town" is a song released by Thin Lizzy frontman Philip Lynott from his 1982 self-titled solo album, The Philip Lynott Album; its lyrics detail the end of a romance. In the music video, Lynott can be seen on the Ha'penny Bridge in Dublin, as well as several other locations around the city centre. The song includes the piano playing of Darren Wharton, the keyboard player from Thin Lizzy. 

"Old Town" was the first record to be officially played on Irish legal Independent Radio. It was the first song played by Dublin's Capital Radio 104.4 on its launch on 20 July 1989.

Chart performance

Track listings

The Corrs version 

The Corrs covered "Old Town" on their 1999 appearance on MTV's Unplugged series, and again with a studio recording for their 2005 album Home.

The live version was released as a single, titled "Old Town (This Boy Is Cracking Up)" in 2000 in Singapore, Belgium and the Netherlands. In 2005 the studio recording was released as a double A-side with "Heart Like a Wheel", and was included on the 2006 compilation Dreams: The Ultimate Corrs Collection. They also performed this song in their In Blue Tour.

The piccolo trumpet solo was played by Ronan Dooney.

Chart performance

Track listings

References 

1982 singles
2000 singles
Songs written by Phil Lynott
Phil Lynott songs
The Corrs songs
Song recordings produced by Mitchell Froom
1982 songs
Songs written by Jimmy Bain
Vertigo Records singles